Tug of War is the debut studio album by Canadian singer-songwriter Carly Rae Jepsen, who came in third on the fifth season of Canadian Idol. The album is produced by Canadian record producer and songwriter Ryan Stewart. Initially, the album was limitedly released in Canada on the independent MapleMusic Recordings label via Fontana North on September 30, 2008. However, it was subsequently given a mainstream release by Canadian label 604 Records, following Jepsen's signing to the label in 2011, including a digital release on the iTunes Store of the United States on June 14. In 2013, the album was released on CD in the United States, through distribution from Alliance Entertainment. In July 2015, the album was released on vinyl in Europe.

Promotion and release
The album's lead single, a cover of John Denver's song "Sunshine on My Shoulders", was released on the iTunes Store on June 16, 2008. The second single, "Tug of War", was released on iTunes Store on September 16, 2008, and peaked at No. 36 on the Canadian Hot 100. The music video was released in January 2009. The third single "Bucket" peaked at No. 32 on the Canadian Hot 100, and samples the children's song, "There's a Hole in My Bucket" and its music video was released in May 2009. The fourth and final single from the album was "Sour Candy" which features Josh Ramsay of Marianas Trench on the single version. Ramsay also produced the latter song and is the only song on the album that was not produced by the album's main producer Ryan Stewart.

As of June 25, 2012, the album has sold 10,000 copies in Canada.

Track listing

Personnel
Credits adapted from Tidal.

 Carly Rae Jepsen – lead vocals
 Ryan Stewart – banjo, bass guitar, clapping, drum programming, drums, guitar, keyboards, percussion, sound effects, vocals, production, engineering, mixing
 Josh Ramsay – bass guitar, drums, guitar, keyboards, background vocals, production, engineering
 João Carvalho – mastering
 Rico Amezquita – cover photo, photography
 Mario Vaira – design, photography

Release history

References

External links
 
 MapleMusic interview

2008 debut albums
604 Records albums
Carly Rae Jepsen albums
Pop rock albums by Canadian artists
MapleMusic Recordings albums
Folk albums by Canadian artists